West Midlands Police Authority, a police authority, is the governing body of the West Midlands Police force in the English county of the West Midlands; encompassing Birmingham, Coventry, Dudley, Sandwell, Solihull, Walsall and Wolverhampton..

Constitution
The Authority has a management board consisting of local councillors and independent members, one of whom is a Magistrate. As of October 2011, the chair is Bishop Dr Derek Webley MBE, of the New Testament Church of God UK, the first non-politician member of Authority to be elected chair, and the first African Caribbean chair of any police authority in the United Kingdom.

References

External links
West Midlands Police Authority Official Website

Local government in the West Midlands (county)
Police authorities in England
2012 disestablishments in England